Sheena Napier is a British costume designer who was nominated at the 65th Academy Awards for her work on the film Enchanted April, for which she was nominated for Best Costumes.

In addition she did win at the  BAFTA Television Awards for the TV film Parade's End, which she was also nominated for an Emmy for.

References

External links

British costume designers
Living people
BAFTA winners (people)
Women costume designers
Year of birth missing (living people)